Mecomycter is a genus of beetles in the family Mauroniscidae, historically included in the family Melyridae. The three known species of this genus are found in North America from Kansas west to California.

Species
 Mecomycter majeri Howell, 1997
 Mecomycter omalinus Horn, 1882
 Mecomycter testaceus Majer, 1995

References

Cleroidea
Cleroidea genera